= Andreas Quednau =

German architect

Andreas Quednau is a German architect, and professor of architecture and urbanism. He is principal of the firm SMAQ for architecture, urbanism and research, that is based in Berlin, Germany. He is Professor of Urban Design at Leibniz University Hannover.

== Life and career ==
Andreas Quednau received a Diploma in Architecture from Technische Universität Berlin and a Master with honours in Advanced Architectural Design from Columbia University, Graduate School for Architecture Planning and Preservation in the City of New York. Before establishing in 2001 with Sabine Müller the office SMAQ for architecture, urbanism and research, he worked with Diller Scofidio + Renfro (New York), KCAP (Rotterdam) and Arata Isozaki (Berlin). Since 2005, his office SMAQ is operating from Berlin.

He taught at Technische Universität Berlin (2005–2007 and 2008–2009) and was Professor of Architecture and Urban Design at the Stuttgart State Academy for Art and Design, School of Architecture (2007–2008 and 2009–2015). In 2015, he was appointed Professor of Urban Design at Leibniz University Hannover, Faculty of Architecture and Landscape Sciences.

== Awards ==
Andreas Quednau's work with his firm SMAQ has been presented at the International Architecture Biennials in Miami, Rotterdam and Venice and has received, among other awards, the prestigious AR Award for Emerging Architecture and the Holcim Award for Sustainable Construction.

== Publications ==
- Sabine Müller / Andreas Quednau, SMAQ. Charter of Dubai – A Manifesto for Critical Urban Transformation (JOVIS Publishers, 2012)
- Sabine Müller / Andreas Quednau, SMAQ. Giraffes, Telegraphs, and Hero of Alexandria – Urban Design by Narration (Ruby Press, 2016)
